Paddy's TV Guide is a British television comedy series created, written and presented by Paddy McGuinness, and broadcast on Channel 4 from 18 January to 8 March 2013. Paddy presents the show from Granada Studios in Manchester, where he guides viewers through the good, bad and ugly world of television, including some TV gold from his archives. The show also features David Plant as "Terry".

Overview
Paddy McGuinness uses his 10-foot plasma television and "Paddy Player" to offer a guide through life. It all takes place in a mock-up of his living room, where the comedy sidekick invites an audience to guffaw at a selection of archive TV and video clips, inter-cut with his scripted reactions. David Plant starred as the non speaking Terry

List of episodes

Reception
The first episode brought in an average of 1.3 million viewers, but ratings slumped for the rest of the series - not a single other episode was one of Channel 4's top 30 most viewed programmes of the week.

The show was universally panned by critics. Nick Norton of "Off the Box" said "The premise of Paddy's TV Guide, in which the host presents a series of lamentable clips from wretched television shows, all on a set theme each episode, is of little consequence. What is remarkable is the line in the credits that tells us it was "Adapted from an original TV format by Paddy McGuiness and ITV". Which means that either ITV thought the show was too substandard even for the dreck it fills ITV2's schedule with, or Channel 4 actually paid good money to take it off its hands. Either way, shame on Channel 4. As [Stewart] Lee himself might say, to watch it really is the equivalent of letting somebody straddle your face and defecate directly onto your eyeballs."

Shouting at Cows's Pippa Harris said: "Paddy's TV Guide is the kind of curve ball Channel 4 likes to throw in amongst Homeland and documentaries about dolphin murder and the alarming 5 minute thought-provokers like Random Acts. Into the mix will suddenly appear something that seems to have burst through the wall from next door at ITV, offerings like the eejit-whisperers of Tool Academy, the now defunct Love Shaft, and the chat shows they keep trying to give to any female celebrity that can make it through a comedy panel show without clawing Jimmy Carr's face off (remember Charlotte Church's chat show? Anyone?). The rest of it drones on with a smattering of sub-Hill physical sketches and commentary that adds about as much as those dialogue boxes that pop up in front of YouTube clips. I don't think any of this is really Paddy's fault – the problem is this format has been done before and much better; he's out of his depth. If he must be on the goggle-box, someone needs to lead him back towards the neon glow of the gameshow.".

Alex Fletcher of Digital Spy was highly critical of the show: "...occasionally a TV monster does cross my path and bewitches with me its sheer awfulness. Celebrity Wrestling, The Farm, "TOWIE Live", Mark Wright's Hollywood Nights and now joining that list is Paddy's TV Guide. ...Paddy's TV Guide is a weird mix of not particularly amusing video clips and buttock-clenchingly awful editing that squeezes hysterical audience laughter on top of every inoffensive but utterly unamusing comment from the show's host." Fletcher concluded his review by saying: "Bafflingly bad, Paddy will do well to wipe this whole project from his wiki page and pretend it never happened if he knows what's best for him."

Redbrick.me's Rosie Pooley slated the programme as well. She said, "I guarantee that 10 minutes spent on youtube will bring up funnier material than Paddy manages to muster. What Channel 4 has yet to realise is that when Paddy is not swinging out the one-liners with a group of 30 girls lapping up every word, every joke he fluffs up falls flat and makes Paddy’s TV Guide frankly awkward to watch."

See also
 Clive James/Floyd on Television/Tarrant on TV - a similar show made by ITV between 1982 - 2006

References

External links

2010s British comedy television series
2013 British television series debuts
2013 British television series endings
Channel 4 comedy
English-language television shows
Television series about television
Television series by ITV Studios